Albert II of Namur was Count of Namur from the death of his elder brother Robert II to his death in 1067. They were the sons of Albert I, and Ermengarde, daughter of duke Charles of Lower Lorraine.

Biography
In 1037, Albert participated in the Battle of Bar-le-Duc against Odo II, Count of Blois, who was seeking to claim for himself the inheritance of his uncle, Rudolph III of Burgundy, which in 1032 had passed to Conrad II and been incorporated into the Holy Roman Empire. In 1046, Albert supported Emperor Henry III in his fight against Godfrey III, Duke of Lower Lorraine, and Baldwin V, Count of Flanders.

In 1047, he founded the collegiate church of St. Albinus at Namur, which became Namur cathedral in 1559.

Marriages and issue

Between 1010 and 1015 he married Regelinde (d. 1067) daughter of Gothelo I, Count of Verdun and Duke of Lorraine and had the following issue:

 Albert III (–1102)
 Henry I, Count of Durbuy (d. 1097 in Palestine)
 Hedwige of Namur, married Gerard, Duke of Lorraine

Notes

References
 

Counts of Namur
House of Namur
10th-century births
1067 deaths
11th-century people of the Holy Roman Empire